Where the Heart Is is a 2000 American romantic drama film directed by Matt Williams and starring Natalie Portman, Stockard Channing, Ashley Judd, and Joan Cusack with supporting roles done by James Frain, Dylan Bruno, Keith David, and Sally Field. The screenplay, written by Lowell Ganz and Babaloo Mandel, is based on the best-selling 1995 novel of the same name by Billie Letts. The film follows five years in the life of Novalee Nation, a pregnant 17-year-old who is abandoned by her boyfriend at a Walmart in a small Oklahoma town. She secretly moves into the store, where she eventually gives birth to her baby, which attracts media attention. With the help of friends, she makes a new life for herself in the town.

Plot

Pregnant, 17-year-old Novalee Nation and her boyfriend, Willy Jack Pickens, are moving from Tennessee to California. He abandons her at a Walmart in Sequoyah, Oklahoma when she enters to use the restroom and buy a pair of shoes. There, Sister Thelma Husband gives her a buckeye tree, and local photographer Moses Whitecotton suggests she give her baby a strong name. 

A sickly and homeless Novalee is forced to live in the Walmart undetected. She also becomes acquainted with curt librarian Forney Hull who cares for his alcoholic sister Mary Elizabeth.

During a thunderstorm, alone at Walmart, Novalee goes into labor. Forney, who had followed her there, smashes through the window to help deliver her child, whom she names Americus. Novalee instantly becomes a media darling and, while in the hospital, is befriended by Nurse Lexie Coop. Her estranged mother, Mama Lil, whom Novalee has not seen in over 12 years, visits after seeing her on television but disappears with 500 dollars in donations. Sister Husband arrives and offers to take in Novalee and Americus.

While Christmas tree shopping with Forney, Novalee realises it is Americus' five-month birthday. She races to Sister's to find that Americus has been kidnapped. A couple from Midnight, Mississippi, who had previously written an ugly letter saying the illegitimate Americus was an abomination, kidnapped her, leaving her in the church nativity scene.

Three years later, Novalee is a photographer thanks to Moses. Willy Jack has become a one-hit-wonder with a song he wrote in jail, and because of music agent Ruth Meyers in Nashville, who gave him a makeover and the stage name "Billy Shadow."

A tornado blows through Sequoyah, and Sister Husband is killed. In her memory, Novalee takes a picture of Americus and the still-standing buckeye tree amidst the storm damage. Sister leaves her everything, around $41,000, but Novalee feels Sister's companion Mr. Sprock deserves the estate. He insists he only wants the kitchen table, as it was where he and Sister often made love. 

Novalee goes to Vegas, to accept an award for the post-tornado photo, narrowly missing Willy Jack, who is also there, but he does not recognize her. His manager Ruth informs him that he is being sued for the rights to "Beat of a Heart" by his old cellmate, Tommy. Willy Jack explains that Tommy had actually beaten him up while writing it, but she does not believe him and drops him. Willy Jack begs her not to leave him, but she does not relent.

Returning to Sequoyah, Novalee finds Lexie has been nearly beaten to death by her most recent 'boyfriend,' who molested her two eldest children, then attacked her as she protected them. Lexie's injuries keep her from nursing, so she and her children move in with Novalee and Americus. Lexie breaks down, feeling guilty and angry, tearfully regretting her choice of men.

When Forney's sister Mary Elizabeth passes away and he does not appear at the funeral, Novalee finds him in a hotel and comforts him. They finally act on their hidden feelings, spending the night together. Forney confesses his love for her, but Novalee feels she is not good enough for him. So, when he says he will stay with her rather than resume his studies at Bowdoin College, Novalee struggles to lie to Forney. Not wanting to hold him back, she says she does not love him. Heartbroken, he returns to Bowdoin.

Lexie begins seeing Ernie, an exterminator who is not her usual type. She falls in love with him when hearing he traded his restored 1967 Chevy Camaro in exchange for custody of his stepdaughter, whom he adopted as his own. They marry, and she becomes pregnant again.

Severely depressed at his ruined career following the lawsuit, Willy Jack becomes an alcoholic. He wanders off drunk, collapses on a railroad track, and is hit by a train.

On Americus' fifth birthday, Novalee sees a newspaper article about Willy Jack having lost his legs four months earlier and recently being robbed of his wheelchair. She visits him in the hospital, and he realizes his whole life would've been different if he had not abandoned her. Seeing Willy Jack is a changed man, Novalee is able to forgive and let go of him but warns him never to contact Americus.

After driving Willy Jack home to Tennessee upon his hospital release, Novalee drives to Maine to find Forney at Bowdoin. She confesses she really does love him, and they return to Oklahoma and marry in the Walmart, where Lexie is seen carrying her newest baby.

Cast
 Natalie Portman as Novalee Nation, a pregnant teen who gets stranded in Sequoyah.
 Ashley Judd as Lexie Coop, a nurse who lives in Sequoyah.
 Stockard Channing as Thelma "Sister" Husband, a promiscuous religious woman in Sequoyah. She is the first to befriend Novalee when Thelma mistakes her for somebody she used to know years earlier.
 Joan Cusack as Ruth Meyers, a cranky music agent.
 James Frain as Forney Hull, a librarian in Sequoyah who becomes Novalee's love interest.
 Dylan Bruno as Willy Jack Pickens, Novalee's ex-boyfriend and presumably Americus' biological father.
 Keith David as Moses Whitecotton, a Walmart portrait photographer who later trains Novalee in photography.
 Richard Andrew Jones as Mr. Sprock, Thelma's partner.
 Sally Field as Mama Lil, the estranged mother of Novalee.
 Laura House as Nicki, one of Novalee's friends from Tennessee.
 Karey Green as Rhonda, one of Novalee's friends from Tennessee.
 Mark Vogues as a religious man from Midnight, Mississippi, who abducts baby Americus.
 Angee Hughes as a religious woman from Midnight, Mississippi, who abducts baby Americus.
 Margaret Hoard as Mary Elizabeth Hull, the sick sister of Forney.
 Mackenzie Fitzgerald as Americus Nation, the daughter of Novalee.
 Alicia Godwin as Jolene, a 14-year-old girl who ropes Willy Jack into assisting in her recent heist.
 Dennis Letts (the book author's husband) as an unnamed sheriff who arrests Willy Jack for being involved in Jolene's heist.
 Rodger Boyce as Officer Harry
 David Alvarado as Tommy Reynolds, a cellmate of Willy Jack during his time in prison.
 Richard Nance as Johnny DeSotto, a known music agent who meets Willy Jack.
 Bob Coonrod as Ernie, an exterminator that becomes Lexie's love interest.
 Cody Linley as Brownie Coop, one of Lexie's children.
 Adrian and Michael Garza as Young Brownie Coop (uncredited)
 Camryn Callaway as Baby Ruth Coop, one of Lexie's children.
 Jessica Hinderliter as Young Baby Ruth Coop
 Shelby Callaway as Cherry Coop, one of Lexie's children.
 Sarah Hinderliter as Young Cherry Coop
 Kaylie Harmony as Praline Coop
 Heather Kafka as Delphia

Jim Beaver had a part in the film as Clawhammer, but his scene was deleted.

Differences between novel and film

 Sister Husband has brown hair in the movie and blue hair in the novel.
 In the novel, Benny Goodluck gives Novalee a buckeye tree for good luck. In the film, Benny is omitted, and the buckeye tree was given to Novalee by Sister Husband.
 In the novel, Jolene is the daughter of a dive bar owner and shifted the blame of her convenience store robbery on him to the police that pull them over. In the film, Jolene's parents aren't mentioned.
 In the novel, Lexie is obese. She is constantly trying new fad diets and weight loss schemes. This aspect of her character is removed from the film version.
 In the novel, Walmart's owner Sam Walton gives Novalee a check while offering her a job at Walmart. Sam Walton's appearance was omitted from the film.
 In the novel, Willy Jack has a heart attack after being struck in the chest. In the film, he gets into a fight with his cellmate.
 In the novel, Willy Jack gets his guitar from the prison librarian Claire Hudson which used to belong to her late son Finny. In the film, it was mentioned that Willy Jack's later cellmate Tommy Reynolds gave him his guitar.
 In the novel, Sister Husband died from her injuries after being trapped in a trailer while visiting a neighbor. Her death is not shown in the film.
 In the novel, Moses has a wife named Certain whom Novalee also becomes close when she and Americus move in with her following Sister Husband's death. She is entirely omitted from the film.
 In the novel, Ruth Meyers ends Willy Jack's career for going behind her back. In the film, she also ends his career when she gets a call from Tommy Reynolds' lawyer, who is suing Jack for taking the song "Beat of a Heart" from him.
 In the novel, Mary Elizabeth Hull dies in the fire at her library. In the film, she succumbs to the complications of her alcoholism.
 In the novel, Lexie marries her co-worker Leon Yoder. In the film, Lexie marries Ernie the exterminator.
 In the novel, Forney instead travels for some time before settling in Chicago. In the film, Forney returns to school.
 In the novel, Willy Jack makes it to California, where he fails to get money from his cousin in Bakersfield, tries to pawn his guitar for money which falls through, and ditches his current girlfriend, which leads to his train accident. In the film, his girlfriend goes into a restaurant to eat, leading to Willy Jack's train accident.
 Novalee's marriage to Forney only occurs in the film.

Music

Original music for the film was produced by Mason Daring. A soundtrack of the original music was released by RCA Records, as well as a music compilation soundtrack featuring songs used in the film by artists such as Emmylou Harris, Lyle Lovett, Martina McBride, and John Hiatt.

The song "That's the Beat of a Heart" was performed by The Warren Brothers and Sara Evans. A music video was made for the song, which is included as a bonus extra on the DVD release and features a number of scenes from the film.

Reception

Critical response 
The film received mostly negative reviews. Metacritic gives it a score of 30% based on reviews from 28 critics. Rotten Tomatoes gives it a 35% approval rating, based on reviews from 97 critics, with the site's consensus stating that the film's "poor script and messy plot undermines the decent cast."

Box office 
The film opened in theaters in the United States on April 28, 2000. Where the Heart Is accumulated (USD)$8,292,939 in its opening weekend, opening at number 4.

The film went on to make $33,772,838 at the North American box office, and an additional $7,090,880 internationally for a worldwide total of $40,863,718.

References

External links
 
 

2000s teen comedy-drama films
2000 films
20th Century Fox films
American teen comedy-drama films
Country music films
Films based on American novels
Films set in department stores
Films set in Oklahoma
Films with screenplays by Babaloo Mandel
Films with screenplays by Lowell Ganz
Teenage pregnancy in film
Walmart
Films scored by Mason Daring
2000 directorial debut films
2000 comedy films
2000 drama films
American pregnancy films
2000s English-language films
2000s American films